The  are a Japanese women's softball team based in Mooka, Tochigi. The Reverta compete in the Japan Diamond Softball League (JD.League) as a member of the league's East Division.

History
The Reverta were founded in 1983, as Honda Engineering softball team. The team was transferred to Honda in 2001.

The Japan Diamond Softball League (JD.League) was founded in 2022, and the Reverta became part of the new league as a member of the East Division.

Roster

References

External links
 
 Honda Reverta - JD.League

Japan Diamond Softball League
Women's softball teams in Japan
Honda
Sports teams in Tochigi Prefecture